The History of State Highways in Virginia begins with Virginia's State Highway Commission, which was formed by the General Assembly in 1906. In 1918 the General Assembly designated a 4002-mile (6441 km) state highway system to be maintained by the commission. Beginning in 1922, the commission was authorized to add annually mileage equal to 2.5% of the original system (100 miles or 161 km). These highways were numbered from 1 into the 20s; by 1922 suffixed spurs had been added (such as 7X from 7). In 1923, the first renumbering was implemented, in which State Routes 1 to 9 became 31 to 39. The spurs were renamed to use numbers rather than letters (such as 114 from 11), and four-digit numbers were used for spurs of spurs (such as 1141 from 114) or for "rollovers" (such as 1010 from 10, as 101 to 109 were all in use).

The United States Numbered Highways were designated in late 1926. In 1928, the state routes were renumbered again; all the spurs were instead numbered by district, using the district number as the first digit. State routes that were also U.S. Routes had signage removed, but continued to be referred to by the Department of Highways (renamed from the State Highway Commission in 1927).

In 1932, the Byrd Road Act promoted by former Governor Harry F. Byrd and the Byrd Organization created the state's "Secondary System" of roads in the counties. Virginia's incorporated towns were provided a local option to participate, and all the counties in Virginia were given the option of turning this responsibility over to the state. However, Virginia's independent cities were excluded, typical of the Byrd Organization and its leader's rural priorities and political power base.

Only four counties of more than 90 initially opted not to join the system. Of these, Nottoway County opted to join the state system in 1933, and in the 1950s, Warwick County became an independent city and was then consolidated with another, forming the modern City of Newport News. (By the end of the 20th century, only Arlington and Henrico Counties were continuing to maintain their own roads.)

Generally, when an area became part of an independent city, through annexation, merger, consolidation, or conversions, the secondary roads passed from the state system to local responsibility. An exception was made by the General Assembly in the former Nansemond County, which like Warwick County, became an independent city (in 1972) and then 18 months later, consolidated with neighboring Suffolk in 1974. Under that special arrangement, VDOT maintained secondary routes in Suffolk until July 1, 2006. This arrangement eventually led to new conflicts over ownership and responsibility for the circa 1928 Kings Highway Bridge across the Nansemond River on State Route 125, which was closed in 2005 by VDOT for safety reasons.

The DoT took over road maintenance from most counties in 1932, forming the state secondary system. These routes were assigned numbers from 600 up, so the primary routes were renumbered again in 1933, assigning smaller ranges to each district. State routes with numbers that conflicted with U.S. Routes were renumbered, and the unsigned concurrencies were dropped. The numbers from 2 to 9 were again assigned (1 was not because of U.S. Route 1):
State Route 2: State Route 50
State Route 3: State Routes 37 and 827
State Route 4: Many routes, including part of State Route 17
State Route 5: State Route 41, part of State Route 39, and State Route 835
State Route 6: Part of State Route 18 and State Route 19
State Route 7: Parts of State Routes 37 and 54 and all of State Route 822
State Route 8: State Route 23
State Route 9: State Route 25
State Route 10 is the smallest number to survive from the 1918 system to the present day, though in a greatly modified form. State Route 35 is largely the same as the original SR 5, renumbered in 1923.

Two more renumberings took place in 1940, when routes ending at state lines were renumbered to match the adjacent state, and in 1958, when routes with numbers used for Interstate Highways were renumbered.

Historic lists of routes

1918-1923
State Route 1
State Route 2
State Route 3
State Route 4
State Route 5
State Route 6
State Route 7
State Route 8
State Route 9
State Route 10
State Route 11
State Route 12
State Route 13
State Route 14

State Route 16
State Route 17
State Route 18
State Route 19
State Route 20
State Route 21
State Route 22
State Route 23
State Route 24
State Route 25
State Route 26
State Route 27
State Route 28

1923-1928
State Route 10
SR 101: 1923 - 1928
SR 102: 1923 - 1928
SR 103: 1923 - 1928
SR 104: 1923 - 1928
SR 105: 1923 - 1928
SR 106: 1923 - 1928
SR 107: 1923 - 1928
SR 108: 1923 - 1928
SR 109: 1923 - 1928
SR 1010: 1924 - 1928
SR 1011: 1924 - 1928
SR 1012: 1924 - 1928
State Route 11
SR 111: 1923 - 1928
SR 112: 1923 - 1928
SR 113: 1923 - 1928
SR 114: 1923 - 1928
SR 1141: 1923 - 1928
SR 115: 1923 - 1928
SR 116: 1923 - 1928
SR 117: 1923 - 1926, 1926 - 1928
SR 118: 1924 - 1928
SR 119: 1924 - 1926, 1926 - 1928
State Route 12
SR 121: 1923 - mid-1920s, 1927 - 1928
SR 122: 1923 - mid-1920s, 1925 - 1928
SR 123: 1923 - 1928
State Route 124
SR 125: 1924 - 1928
State Route 13
SR 131: 1923 - 1928
SR 132: 1923 - 1928
SR 133: 1926 - 1928
State Route 14
SR 141: 1923 - 1928
SR 142: 1923 - mid-1920s
SR 143: 1923 - 1928
State Route 144
State Route 15
State Route 16
State Route 17
SR 171: 1923 - 1928
SR 172: 1923 - mid-1920s
State Route 18
SR 181: 1924 - 1928
SR 182: 1927 - 1928
State Route 19
SR 191: 1927 - 1928
State Route 20
State Route 201
State Route 202
State Route 21
State Route 211
State Route 212
SR 213: 1924 - mid-1920s
State Route 22
State Route 221
State Route 23
SR 231: 1924 - 1928
State Route 232
State Route 24
State Route 25
SR 251: 1924 - mid-1920s, mid-1920s - 1928
State Route 26
State Route 27
State Route 28
State Route 29
State Route 291
State Route 30
State Route 31
State Route 311
State Route 3111
SR 312: 1923 - 1928
SR 313: 1924 - 1928
SR 314: 1924 - 1925, mid-1920s, 1926 - 1928
State Route 315
State Route 316
State Route 32
SR 321: 1923 - 1927
SR 322: 1923 - 1926
State Route 323
SR 324: mid-1920s - unknown
SR 325: 1923 - 1926
State Route 326
SR 327: 1925 - mid-1920s
State Route 33
State Route 331
SR 332: 1924 - 1928
SR 333: 1924 - 1928
State Route 334
SR 335: 1924 - 1928
State Route 336
SR 337: 1925 - 1928
State Route 338
SR 339: 1927 - 1928
State Route 34
SR 341: 1923 - 1928
SR 342: 1923 - 1928
SR 343: 1926 - 1928
State Route 35
SR 351: 1924 - 1928
State Route 36
State Route 361
State Route 37
SR 371: 1923 - 1928
SR 372: 1923 - 1928
SR 373: 1923 - 1928
SR 374: 1923 - 1928
SR 375: 1925 - 1928
State Route 376
SR 377: 1927 - 1928
State Route 38
State Route 39
SR 391: 1923 - 1928
SR 392: 1923 - 1928
SR 393: 1923 - 1928
SR 394: 1923 - 1928
SR 395: 1924 - 1928
State Route 396
SR 397: 1926 - 1928
State Route 40
State Route 41

1928-1933
State Route 10
State Route 11
State Route 12
State Route 13
State Route 14
State Route 15
State Route 16
State Route 17
State Route 18
State Route 19
State Route 20
State Route 21
State Route 22
State Route 23
State Route 24
State Route 25
State Route 26
State Route 27
State Route 28
State Route 29
State Route 30
State Route 31
State Route 32
State Route 33
State Route 34
State Route 35
State Route 36
State Route 37
State Route 38
State Route 39
State Route 40
State Route 41
State Route 42
State Route 43
State Route 44
State Route 45
State Route 46
State Route 47
State Route 48
State Route 49
State Route 50
State Route 51
State Route 52
State Route 53
State Route 54
State Route 55
State Route 56
State Route 57
State Route 58
State Route 59

District 1
SR 100: 1928 - 1933
SR 101: 1928 - 1933
SR 102: 1928 - 1933
SR 103: 1928 - 1933
SR 104: 1928 - 1933
SR 105: 1928 - early 1930s
SR 106: 1928 - 1933
SR 107: 1928 - 1933
SR 108: 1928 - 1933
SR 109: 1928 - 1933
SR 110: 1928 - 1933
SR 111: 1928 - 1933
SR 112: 1928 - 1933
SR 113: 1928 - 1933
SR 114: 1928 - 1933
SR 115: 1928 - 1933
SR 116: 1928 - 1930, 1930 - early 1930s
SR 117: 1928 - 1933
SR 118: 1928 - 1933
SR 119: 1928 - 1933
SR 120: 1928 - 1933
SR 121: 1928 - 1933
SR 122: 1928 - 1933
SR 123: 1928 - 1933
SR 124: 1928 - early 1930s
SR 125: 1928 - early 1930s
SR 126: 1928 - 1933
SR 127: 1928 - 1933
SR 128: 1928 - 1933
SR 129: 1928 - 1933
SR 130: 1928 - 1933
SR 131: 1928 - 1933
SR 132: 1930 - 1933
SR 133: 1930 - 1933
SR 134: 1930 - 1933
SR 135: 1930 - 1933
SR 136: 1930 - 1933
SR 137: 1930 - 1933
SR 138: 1930 - 1933
SR 139: 1931 - 1933

District 2
State Route 200
State Route 201
State Route 202
State Route 203
State Route 204
State Route 205
SR 206: 1928 - 1930, 1930 - 1933
State Route 207
State Route 208
State Route 209
State Route 210
State Route 211
State Route 212
State Route 213
State Route 214
State Route 215
State Route 216
State Route 217
State Route 218
State Route 219
State Route 220
State Route 221
State Route 222
State Route 223
State Route 224
State Route 225
State Route 226
State Route 227
SR 228: 1932 - 1933

District 3
State Route 300
State Route 301
SR 302: 1928 - 1930, 1930 - 1931
State Route 303
State Route 304
State Route 305
State Route 306
State Route 307
State Route 308
State Route 309
State Route 310
State Route 311
State Route 312
State Route 313
State Route 314
State Route 315
State Route 316
State Route 317
State Route 318
State Route 319
State Route 320
State Route 321
State Route 322

District 4
State Route 400
State Route 401
State Route 402
State Route 403
State Route 404
State Route 405
State Route 406
State Route 407
State Route 408
State Route 409
State Route 410
State Route 411
State Route 412
State Route 413
State Route 414
State Route 415
State Route 416
State Route 417
State Route 418
State Route 419
State Route 420
State Route 421
State Route 422
State Route 423
State Route 424
State Route 425
State Route 426
State Route 427
State Route 428
State Route 429
State Route 430
State Route 431
State Route 432
State Route 433
State Route 434
State Route 435
State Route 436
State Route 437
State Route 438
State Route 439
State Route 440

District 5
SR 500: 1928 - 1933
SR 501: 1928 - early 1930s, early 1930s - 1933
SR 502: 1928 - 1933
SR 503: 1928 - 1933
SR 504: 1928 - 1933
SR 505: 1928 - 1933
SR 506: 1928 - 1933
SR 507: 1928 - 1933
SR 508: 1928 - 1933
SR 509: 1928 - 1933
SR 510: 1928 - 1933
SR 511: 1928 - 1933
SR 512: 1928 - 1933
SR 513: 1928 - 1933
SR 514: 1928 - 1933
SR 515: 1928 - 1933
SR 516: 1928 - 1933
SR 517: 1928 - 1933
SR 518: 1928 - 1933
SR 519: 1928 - 1933
SR 520: 1928 - 1933
SR 521: 1928 - 1933
SR 522: 1928 - 1933
SR 523: 1928 - 1933
SR 524: 1928 - 1933
SR 525: 1928 - 1933
SR 526: 1929 - 1933
SR 527: 1929 - 1930, 1930 - 1933
SR 528: 1929 - 1933
SR 529: 1930 - 1933
SR 530: 1930, 1930 - 1932, 1932 - 1933
SR 531: 1930 - 1933
SR 532: 1930 - 1933
SR 533: 1930 - 1933
SR 534: 1930 - early 1930s
SR 535: 1930 - 1933
SR 536: 1930 - 1933
SR 537: 1930 - 1933
SR 538: 1930 - 1933
SR 539: 1930 - 1933
SR 540: 1931 - 1933
SR 541: 1931 - 1933
SR 542: 1932 - 1933

District 6
State Route 600
State Route 601
State Route 602
State Route 603
State Route 604
State Route 605
State Route 606
State Route 607
State Route 608
State Route 609
State Route 610
State Route 611
State Route 612
State Route 613
State Route 614
State Route 615
State Route 616
State Route 617
State Route 618
State Route 619
State Route 620
State Route 621
State Route 622
State Route 623
State Route 624
State Route 625
State Route 626
State Route 627
State Route 628
State Route 629
State Route 630
State Route 631
State Route 632

District 7
SR 700: 1928 - 1933
SR 701: 1928 - 1933
SR 702: 1928 - 1933
SR 703: 1928 - early 1930s
SR 704: 1928 - 1933
SR 705: 1928 - 1933
SR 706: 1928 - 1933
SR 707: 1928 - 1933
SR 708: 1928 - 1933
SR 709: 1928 - 1933
SR 710: 1928 - 1933
SR 711: 1928 - 1933
SR 712: 1928 - 1933
SR 713: 1928 - 1933
SR 714: 1930 - 1933
SR 715: 1930 - 1933
SR 716: 1930 - 1933
SR 717: 1930 - 1933
SR 718: 1930 - early 1930s, 1932 - 1933
SR 719: 1930 - 1933
SR 720: 1930 - 1933
SR 721: 1930 - 1933
SR 722: 1930 - 1933
SR 723: 1930 - 1933
SR 724: 1931 - early 1930s
SR 725: 1931 - 1933
SR 726: 1931 - 1933
SR 727: 1931 - 1933

District 8
State Route 800
State Route 801
State Route 802
State Route 803
State Route 804
State Route 805
State Route 806
State Route 807
State Route 808
State Route 809
State Route 810
State Route 811
State Route 812
State Route 813
State Route 814
State Route 815
State Route 816
State Route 817
State Route 818
State Route 819
State Route 820
State Route 821
State Route 822
State Route 823
State Route 824
State Route 825
State Route 826
State Route 827
State Route 828
State Route 829
State Route 830
State Route 831
State Route 832
State Route 833
State Route 834
State Route 835
State Route 836
State Route 837
State Route 838
State Route 839

References